This is the discography for British heavy metal band Halford.

Albums

Studio albums

Live albums

Compilation albums

Extended plays

Singles

Video albums

Music videos

References 

Discographies of British artists
Heavy metal group discographies